Forreston Township is located in Ogle County, Illinois. As of the 2010 census, its population was 2,080 and it contained 885 housing units. Forreston Township was formed from a portion of Brookville Township on March 4, 1857. The village of Forreston and the unincorporated community of Baileyville are located within it.

Geography

Demographics

References

External links 
City-data.com
Midwest Government Info
Illinois State Archives

Townships in Ogle County, Illinois
Populated places established in 1857
Townships in Illinois
1857 establishments in Illinois